Wampar (Dzob Wampar) is an Austronesian language of Wampar Rural LLG, Morobe Province, Papua New Guinea.

It is spoken in the 8 villages (wards) of Dzifasin, Tararan, Gabsongkeg, Ngasowapum, Munun, Mare, Gabandzidz, and Wamped.

Further reading
Beer, Bettina, and Hans Fischer. Wampar–English Dictionary with an English–Wampar finder list. ANU Press, 2021.

References

Markham languages
Languages of Morobe Province